Polk Township (T9N R8W) is located in Macoupin County, Illinois, United States. As of the 2010 census, its population was 563 and it contained 287 housing units.

Geography

Demographics

Adjacent townships
 Bird Township (north)
 Carlinville Township (northeast)
 Brushy Mound Township (east)
 Gillespie Township (southeast)
 Hillyard Township (south)
 Shipman Township (southwest)
 Chesterfield Township (west)
 Western Mound Township (northwest)

References

External links
US Census
City-data.com
Illinois State Archives

Townships in Macoupin County, Illinois
Townships in Illinois